Frederick Martin Stephen Egonda-Ntende is a Ugandan judge who serves as a Justice of the Court of Appeal of Uganda, which doubles as the Constitutional Court of Uganda. Prior to that, from 2009 until 2014, he served as the Chief Justice of the Seychelles. He was sworn in as Chief Justice on Friday, August 21, 2009 at State House in the Seychelles capital city, Victoria. Prior to that he served as Acting Justice of the Supreme Court of Uganda. He was also involved in the setting up of an independent judiciary in East Timor, where he served as a judge of the Court of Appeal.

Egonda-Ntende lectured Law at Makerere University in Uganda and was the chairperson of the Law Reporting Committee of the Judiciary in Uganda. He also has extensive experience in dealing with matters of drug trafficking while working as a judge in the United Nations Mission in Kosovo (UNMIK).

References

Ugandan judges
Year of birth missing (living people)
Living people
Ugandan judges on the courts of Seychelles
Ugandan judges on the courts of East Timor
Ugandan judges on the courts of Kosovo
Chief justices of Seychelles
Justices of the Court of Appeal of Uganda